The Ferrari 335 S was a sports racing car produced by Italian manufacturer Ferrari in 1957. The car was a direct response to the Maserati 450S which with its 4.5-litre engine was threatening to overpower the 3.8-litre 315 S and 3.5-litre 290 MM. Four cars were produced in total.

Development

This model was the protagonist of the accident in the 1957 Mille Miglia, which led to the cancellation of the race starting from the following year. In its World Championship debut in the third round of the 1957 season, a 335 S (#531), driven by Spanish driver Alfonso de Portago (who had replaced an ill Luigi Musso) was in third position, running on a long straight road sector between the Lombard hamlets of Cerlongo and Guidizzolo. When one of the tyres exploded, de Portago's car slipped to the right and crashed against a large crowd, killing ten spectators, as well as de Portago himself and American co-driver Edmund Nelson. The other 335 S in the hands of Peter Collins and Louis Klemantaski had broken down whilst in the lead giving victory to a 315 S driven by Piero Taruffi. 

Due to the accident only a single 335 S in the hands of Collins and Olivier Gendebien was entered in the next round at the Nürburgring 1000km and came second behind an Aston Martin DBR1 and although both 335 S models failed at Le Mans, Collins and Phil Hill obtained another second place at the Swedish GP behind a Maserati 450S with Mike Hawthorn and Luigi Musso finishing fourth in the sister car. In the final round of the World Sports Car Championship at the Venezuelan Grand Prix, a 335 S raced by Collins and Phil Hill won with Hawthorn and Musso finishing second. These results added to the earlier Mille Miglia victory by a 315 S and the win in the Buenos Aires 1000 Km by a 290 MM gave the World title to Ferrari. The change in regulations for the World Championship to a 3-litre engine limit which was a reaction to the Mille Miglia crash and earlier tragedies rendered the 335 S ineligible for the 1958 season onwards and Ferrari replaced the model with its 250 TR.

In 2016, a 1957 Ferrari 335 S Spider Scaglietti sold for €32.1 million in an auction in Paris. In 315 S guise the car had finished sixth in the 12 Hours of Sebring in 1957 driven by Peter Collins and Maurice Trintignant and later driven by Wolfgang von Trips, to a second place finish at the 1957 Mille Miglia. After having its engine upgraded to a 4.0-litre model, it then set the lap record at Le Mans, finished fourth in the Swedish GP and second in the Venezuelan GP. Finally it won the 1958 Cuban Grand Prix driven by Stirling Moss.

References

Bibliography

External links

Ferrari 335 S: Ferrari History

335 S
Sports racing cars
Mille Miglia
24 Hours of Le Mans race cars